Mayis Minasyan (Armenian:) is a former Iranian footballer. He played as a midfielder for the PAS Tehran, Taj SC and Ararat.

Honours

Club
Pas
Iranian Football League: 1974–75

References

External links
 
 Mayis Minasyan at TeamMelli.com

1951 births
Living people
Pas players
Esteghlal F.C. players
F.C. Ararat Tehran players
Ethnic Armenian sportspeople
Iranian footballers
Iranian people of Armenian descent
Association football midfielders
Iran international footballers